The 2013 Philippine Basketball Association (PBA) Governors' Cup Finals (also known as the 2013 PLDT Telpad PBA Governors' Cup Finals for sponsorship reasons) was the best-of-7 championship series of the 2013 PBA Governors' Cup, and the conclusion of the conference's playoffs. Petron Blaze and San Mig Coffee competed for the 109th championship contested by the league. This was the first time the two teams met in the finals since the 2000 PBA Governors' Cup Finals when the Petron Blaze Boosters (then known as the San Miguel Beermen) defeated the San Mig Coffee Mixers (then known as the Purefoods TJ Hotdogs) in five games.

Background

Road to the finals

Head-to-head matchup
The conference head-to-head matchup was on August 31, 2013 at the Mall of Asia Arena.

Series summary

Game 1

Game 2

Game 3

Game 4

Game 5

Game 6

Game 7

Rosters

{| class="toccolours" style="font-size: 95%; width: 100%;"
|-
! colspan="2" style="background-color: #; color: #; text-align: center;"|San Mig Coffee Mixers Governors' Cup roster
|- style="background-color:#; color: #; text-align: center;"
! Players !! Coaches
|-
| valign="top" |
{| class="sortable" style="background:transparent; margin:0px; width:100%;"
! Pos. !! # !! POB !! Name !! Height !! Weight !! !! College 
|-
                                                         
           

  
 

{| class="toccolours" style="font-size: 95%; width: 100%;"
|-
! colspan="2" style="background-color: #; color: #; text-align: center;"|Petron Blaze Boosters Governors' Cup roster
|- style="background-color:#; color: #; text-align: center;"
! Players !! Coaches
|-
| valign="top" |
{| class="sortable" style="background:transparent; margin:0px; width:100%;"
! Pos. !! # !! POB !! Name !! Height !! Weight !! !! College 
|-

Broadcast notes

Additional Game 7 crew:
Trophy presentation: Aaron Atayde
Dugout celebration interviewer: Nikko Ramos

TV ratings

References

External links
PBA official website

2012–13 PBA season
2013
San Miguel Beermen games
Magnolia Hotshots games
PBA Governors' Cup Finals